Carmel Buckley (born 1956) is a British artist. 

Her work is included in collections of the Museum of Fine Arts Houston and the National Gallery of Art, Washington.

References

Living people
1956 births
20th-century American women artists
21st-century American women artists